In the 1930 federal election in Canada, five supporters of the United Farmers ran in Saskatchewan as "Farmer" candidates. None of them were elected. Additionally, in the 1925 federal election, one supporter of the Progressive Party of Canada ran in Quebec as a "Farmer" candidate.

See also
 List of political parties in Canada

Federal political parties in Canada